Maxence Renoud (born 8 February 2000) is a French professional footballer who plays as a winger for Lyon La Duchère.

Professional career
With 9 assist in his debut season with Montceau, Renoud was the top assister in the Championnat National 3. On 15 June 2020, Renoud signed a professional contract with Grenoble. Renoud made his professional debut with Grenoble in a 1-0 Ligue 2 loss to Guingamp on 26 September 2020.

On 9 June 2021, he signed with Concarneau.

On 30 June 2022, Renoud joined Lyon La Duchère on a one-year deal.

References

External links
 
 FDB Profile

2000 births
Living people
People from Voiron
French footballers
Football Bourg-en-Bresse Péronnas 01 players
Grenoble Foot 38 players
US Concarneau players
Lyon La Duchère players
Ligue 2 players
Championnat National players
Championnat National 3 players
Association football wingers
Sportspeople from Isère
Footballers from Auvergne-Rhône-Alpes